Diphyes may refer to:
 Diphyes (hydrozoan), a genus of hydrozoans in the family Diphyidae
 Diphyes, a genus of plants in the family  	Orchidaceae, synonym of Bulbophyllum
 Diphyes, a genus of wasps in the family Ichneumonidae, synonym of Diphyus